A bench trial is a trial by judge, as opposed to a trial by jury.  The term applies most appropriately to any  administrative hearing in relation to a summary offense to distinguish the type of trial. Many legal systems (Roman, Islamic) use bench trials for most or all cases or for certain types of cases.

While a jury renders a verdict, a judge in a bench trial does the same by making a finding.

United Kingdom

England and Wales

The majority of civil trials proceed without a jury and are heard by a judge sitting alone. 

Summary criminal trials may be heard by a single district judge (magistrates' court) or by a panel of at least two, but more usually three, magistrates.

Section 47 Criminal Justice Act 2003 does allow a bench trial for indictable offences, but is rarely used, having been exercised only two times since its inception.

Scotland

Most civil trials in Scotland are conducted in a sheriff court by a sheriff sitting alone.  In the Court of Session, a judge in either the outer or inner house usually sits alone; but however may sit with a jury in certain trials such as personal injury claims.  See: Trial by jury in Scotland

Summary criminal trials are conducted by a sheriff in a sheriff court or a justice of the peace in the justice of the peace court sitting alone as regulated by the Criminal Procedure (Scotland) Act 1995.  Those trials requiring juries are called solemn procedure and are also regulated under the aforementioned Act.

Turks and Caicos
One of the recommendations of the Commission of Inquiry 2008–2009 in Turks and Caicos was that provisions be made for criminal trials without juries, following the precedent in England and Wales. Other examples cited included the United States, the Commonwealth of Nations including India and Canada, the British overseas territories of the Falkland Islands and St. Helena, and the Netherlands.

United States

In U.S. law, for most criminal cases that proceed to trial, trial by jury is usually a matter of course as it is a constitutional right under the Sixth Amendment and cannot be waived without certain requirements. In the federal court system, under rule 23 of the Federal Rules of Criminal Procedure, if a defendant is entitled to a jury trial, the trial must be by jury unless (1) the defendant waives a jury trial in writing thus dismissing is right to a trial by jury.  In the various state court systems, waiver of jury trial can vary by jurisdiction. Missouri has Missouri Supreme Court Rule 27.01(b), "The defendant may, with the assent of the court, waive a trial by jury and submit the trial of any criminal case to the court..."; the prosecution need not consent.

With bench trials, the judge plays the role of the jury as finder of fact in addition to making conclusions of law. In some bench trials, both sides have already stipulated to all the facts in the case (such as civil disobedience cases designed to test the constitutionality of a law). These cases are usually faster than jury trials because of the fewer formalities required. For example, there is no jury selection phase and no need for sequestration or jury instructions.

A bench trial (whether criminal or civil) that is presided over by a judge has some distinctive characteristics, but it is basically the same as a jury trial, only without the jury.  For example, the rules of evidence and methods of objection are the same in a bench trial as in a jury trial. Bench trials, however, are frequently more informal than jury trials. It is often less necessary to protect the record with objections, and sometimes evidence is accepted de bene or provisionally, subject to the possibility of being struck in the future.

Civil law
In most countries with "Roman law" or civil law, there is no "jury" in the English sense, and trials are necessarily bench trials. However, in more complicated cases, lay judges can be called. They are not randomly selected, as juries are. They are volunteers and vote as judges.

See also
Bench (law)
Jury trial
Criminal law
Civil law
Diplock courts
Special Criminal Court

References

Types of trials